Ciudad Deportiva Villarreal CF, also known as Ciudad Deportiva Pamesa Cerámica for sponsorship reasons, is the training ground of Villarreal CF, and is located in Villarreal.

Occupying an area of 70,000 m², the training centre is located at the western suburbs of Villarreal.

Facilities
Mini Estadi, with a capacity of 3,500 seats, is the home stadium of Villarreal CF B, the reserve team of Villarreal CF.
2 grass pitches (100x65m)
2 artificial pitches (90x60m)
3 mini artificial pitches (60x35m)
Service centre with gymnasium

External links
 villarrealcf.es
Estadios de España 

Villarreal
Villarreal CF
Sports venues completed in 2003